David Jessen (born 5 December 1996) is a Czech male artistic gymnast, representing his nation in international competitions. He participated at the 2015 World Artistic Gymnastics Championships in Glasgow, and qualified for the 2016 Summer Olympics, securing one of the spots available at the Olympic Test Event in Rio de Janeiro. He also competed in the 2020 Summer Olympics.
 
Jessen is the son of 1988 Olympic gymnast Hana Říčná. He was born in Brno, Czech Republic, but moved to the United States as a child. He represented the US as a junior before switching to compete for the Czech Republic.

Jessen studied Molecular, Cellular and Developmental Biology at Stanford University where he was part of the Stanford Cardinals men’s gymnastics team.

References

External links 
 

1996 births
Living people
Czech male artistic gymnasts
Sportspeople from Brno
Gymnasts at the 2016 Summer Olympics
Olympic gymnasts of the Czech Republic
European Games competitors for the Czech Republic
Gymnasts at the 2015 European Games
Czech expatriate sportspeople in the United States
Gymnasts at the 2020 Summer Olympics